Mauritian Australians are Australians of Mauritian descent, or who were born in Mauritius.

The Census in 2011 recorded 23 280 Mauritius-born people in Australia, an increase of 28.1 percent from the 2006 Census.

The 2011 distribution by state and territory showed Victoria had the largest number with 11 600 followed by New South Wales (5752), Western Australia (3932) and Queensland (1476).

Mauritians are a rapidly growing migrant group having increased steadily over the past 30 years.

Many Franco-Mauritians and Creole mixed families seeking better opportunities for their children migrated to Australia. The Franco-Mauritians helped to develop Queensland's sugar industry.

Cultural background
As Mauritius is a country with a multicultural and multiethnic society, Mauritians have different and diverse ethnic backgrounds. However, in the 2011 Census most Mauritius-born people living in Australia reported being of Mauritian descent (13,651), followed by those of French (4,536) and Chinese descent (2,057).

Base on ethnic lines, Creole Mauritians (Black and mixed-race) represent 50% of the community in Australia, this group were largest numbers leaving Mauritius after independence from colonial rule (Britain, and previously, France) in 1968. Chinese-Mauritians make up 7%, arriving mostly during the 80s and 90s, those of Indian ancestry are 20-25% and Creoles of African ancestry 20-25%.                    
Most of the Afro-Mauritians and Indians have arrived after the 2000s, and are the fastest growing part of the community.
Mauritian-Australians have a growing presence in Australian popular culture, including in music, literature, and television. Aisha in The Slap is a notable example, identified in the TV series adaptation as 'Mauritian-Australian'. Havana Brown is a significant Australian musician of Mauritian background.

Language
The main languages spoken by Mauritius-born people in Australia were French (12,545), English (5,665) and Mauritian (2,654). Note that Australia has a large French-speaking Mauritian community in relation to percentage of the overall Mauritian community, they represent 1.4% of the Mauritian community, although numbers would be much higher, but most of the second generation speak English. The French speakers using the language as mother tongue represent the White-Mauritians or gens de couleur (mixed-race Creoles) ethnic groups, making up at least 50% of the Mauritian community in Australia. In comparison, in Mauritius 4.1% of the population speaks French as a first language (mother tongue) with 68.6% using French as a second language making a total of 72.7% French speakers.

Notable people
 Ivan Astruc- Australian rules footballer
 Jake Adelson- footballer
 Angry Anderson- rock singer-songwriter, television presenter-reporter and actor
 Ludovic Boi- footballer
 Ralph Babet- Senator
 Shalom Brune-Franklin- actress
 Havana Brown- DJ, singer, recording artist, record producer and dancer.
 Orwin Castel- footballer
 Denis Constantin- badminton player
 Jean-Paul De Marigny- footballer, Football Manager, former Socceroo
 Marcus Dimanche- footballer
 Chris Driver- footballer
 Edward Duyker- historian, biographer and author
 Drozena Eden-  Australian rules footballer
 Laurina Fleure- Model and TV Personality
 Andrew Florent- tennis player
 Oliver Florent- Australian rules footballer
 Tyrese Francois- footballer
 Genevieve Gregson- Athlete
 Doug Ithier- footballer
 Mahesh Jadu- actor
 Bob Joshua- politician
 Patrick Kisnorbo- footballer, Football Manager, former Socceroo
 Cooper Legrand- footballer
 Bert La Bonté- actor
 John La Nauze- historian
 Fabrice Lapierre- long jumper
 Disco Montego- R&B & Dance group
 Thomas Shadrach Peersahib- herbalist, teacher, activist
 Lloyd Rees- painter
 Anabelle Smith- Diving
 Arthur Stace- soldier
 Starley- singer and songwriter
 Nick Sullivan- footballer
 Nikolai Topor-Stanley- footballer, former Socceroo
 Jordi Valadon- footballer
 Bernard Zuel- journalist

See also

 Mauritians

References

 
African Australian
Australia